TM104: The Legend of the Snowman is the eleventh studio album by American rapper Jeezy. It was released on August 23, 2019, by YJ Music, Inc. & CTE World, under exclusive license to Def Jam Recordings. The album features guest appearances from Meek Mill, Ty Dolla Sign, CeeLo Green, Rick Ross, Gunna, John Legend and Queen Naija, among others.

Background
Shortly after touring for his previous album Pressure, in early 2018 Jeezy announced on social media that he will retire from rap after the release of "TM104" to pursue a career in acting and to focus on his business ventures.

Singles
The album's lead single, "1 Time", was released on July 3, 2019.  The album's second single, "MLK BLVD" featuring Meek Mill, was released to streaming services on August 13, 2019, and was sent to US rhythmic contemporary radio on September 24, 2019.

Critical reception

Fred Thomas of AllMusic expressed a mixed response saying "Approaching 20 years in the game, Jeezy's grizzly voice and boldly evocative lyrics have lost none of their power, though the 18-song album finds him spending as much time encouraging listeners to rise to their potential as he does crafting vivid scenes of rugged street hustling". Eric Diep of HipHopDx gave the album a 3.5 out of 5 stars and noted Jeezy's production selection on the album by saying "Overall, you get a bit of both worlds: Jeezy staying in his lane, but also pushing himself to rap over unlikely production". Diep then concluded in the review by saying "What fans are left with is an album that clearly shows he’s moving on from his decades-long hustle of music to focus on his many business moves."

Track listing
Credits were adapted from the album's liner notes.

Notes
  signifies a co-producer
  signifies an additional producer

Sample credits
 "The enTRAPreneur" contains introducing and closing speech from Gary Vaynerchuk.
 "1 Time" contains a sample from "Under Pressure" by Nick Ingman.
 "Fake Love" contains a sample from "I Love You", performed by Faith Evans.
 "4Play" contains a sample from "On the Hotline", performed by Pretty Ricky.
 "The Real MVP" contains audio excerpts from Kevin Durant's 2014 MVP Award speech.

Charts

References

2019 albums
Jeezy albums
Def Jam Recordings albums
Albums produced by J.U.S.T.I.C.E. League
Albums produced by Lex Luger
Sequel albums